The Clemson Tigers men's basketball teams of 2000–2005 represented Clemson University in NCAA college basketball competition.

1999–2000

2000–01

2001–02

2002–03

The Tigers played their first 8 home games at the Civic Center of Anderson in nearby Anderson, South Carolina, during renovations to Littlejohn Coliseum.

2003–04

2004–05

2005–06

2006–07

2007–08

2008–09

References

Games: 
Coaches: 

Clemson Tigers men's basketball seasons